VDM may refer to:

 VDM Metals, a producer of nickel alloys and stainless steels
 formerly known as Vereinigte Deutsche Metallwerke, a manufacturer of aircraft propeller systems
 VDM Publishing, a publishing group specializing in publishing German, French and English theses and dissertations
 Van der Moolen N.V., a Dutch trading company
 Verbi dei minister, an informal designation as a Christian minister
 Vienna Development Method, a formal software development method
 Value driven maintenance, industrial maintenance management methodology.
 Virtual DOS machine
 Vulnerability Discovery Model, used to estimate future vulnerability discovery process/trend